The DLD is the name for an automobile engine family – a group of compact inline-four Diesel engines, involving development by Ford of Britain and/or PSA Group (Peugeot and Citroën), and also Mazda where it is called the MZ-CD or CiTD. The Ford of Britain/PSA and  joint-venture for the production of the DLD/DV was announced in September 1998. Half of the total engine count are produced at Ford of Britain's main plant at Dagenham, England and at Ford's Chennai plant in India, the other half at PSA's Trémery plant in France.

The inline-four engines are sold under the DuraTorq TDCi name by Ford, and as the HDi by Citroën and Peugeot. and Mazda also uses the Ford-made DLD engine in the Mazda2 and the Mazda3.

Officially, there are three families of engines in the range:
 The 1.4 L DLD-414 is generally non-intercooled
 The 1.5 L DLD-415 derived from the 1.6 L
 The 1.6 L DLD-416 is always intercooled

Ford later added their unrelated 1.8 L DLD-418 engine to the DLD family, though it is properly part of the Ford Endura-D engine family.

In 2012, Ford added the 1.5-litre, closely derived from the 1.6-litre engine.

DLD-414
The Duratorq DLD-414 (or DV4) is a 1.4 L (1398 cc) straight-4 turbo-diesel.

The DV4 is available in two versions:
 One, a SOHC 8-valve design, uses a KKK KP35 turbocharger but no intercooler. This is the same turbocharger as the Renault K9K Diesel. It is Euro 3 compliant, but will receive a Diesel particulate filter from 2006 to make it Euro 4 compliant. In Ford, Mazda, and most PSA applications it uses a Siemens SID804 or SID802 common rail injection system. The PSA Variant in the 2005-2008 Citroën C1/Peugeot 107/Toyota Aygo 1.4 HDi uses the Siemens SID805 common rail injection system with a lower power output compared to other applications to compensate for the weaker 5-speed manual transmission used in these models.  In some PSA applications a Bosch common rail system is used. 
 A second version uses a DOHC 16-valve design, with an intercooled variable-geometry turbocharger. This engine uses Delphi Corp.'s DCR1400 common-rail injection system. This derivation will no longer be built from 2006, as it will not be able to comply with the EURO4 regulations.

 8-valve non-intercooled,  and 
 2005–2008 Citroën C1/Peugeot 107/Toyota Aygo 1.4 HDi
 8-valve non-intercooled,  and 
 2003–2009 Citroën C2 1.4 HDi
 8-valve non-intercooled,  and 
 2002–2016 Citroën C3 1.4 HDi
 2002–2008 Ford Fiesta 1.4 TDCi
 2002–2008 Ford Fusion (Europe) 1.4 TDCi
 2002–2009 Peugeot 206 1.4 HDi
 2006–2014 Peugeot 207/207+ 1.4 HDi
 2005–2009 Peugeot 1007 1.4 HDi  
 2004 Citroën Xsara 1.4 HDi
 2002–2007 Mazda 2/Demio 1.4D
 2008–present Mazda 2/Demio 1.4D
 2007–present Ford Figo 1.4 TDCi Fiesta, also marketed as the Ikon in South Africa.
 2008–present Ford Bantam TDCi commercial vehicle in South Africa.
 16-valve intercooled,  and 
 2001–2005 Citroën C3 1.4 HDi 16V
 2002–2005 Suzuki Liana 1.4 DDiS

DLD-415
The Duratorq DLD-415 (or DV5) is a 1.5 L (1499 cc) straight-4 turbo-diesel developed by Ford and PSA Group.

The PSA variant has a DOHC 16-valve design, while the Ford variant has a SOHC 8-valve design. The DV5 with an intercooled variable-geometry turbocharger (for example, Garrett GT1544V), and with Diesel particulate filter is Euro 6.2 compliant.

It is based on the DV6 SOHC engine.

 16-valve intercooled,  and 
2018– Peugeot Rifter/Partner 1.5 BlueHDi 75CV	
2018– Citroën Berlingo III 1.5 BlueHDi 75CV
2018– Opel Combo E 1.5 Diesel 75cv
 16-valve intercooled,  and 
 2018– Peugeot 2008 1.5 BlueHDi 100CV
 2019– Opel Zafira Life / Vivaro C 1.5 Diesel
 2018– Peugeot Traveller/Citroën Spacetourer 1.5 BlueHDi 100CV
 2018– Toyota ProAce 1.5 D4-D
 2018– Peugeot Rifter/Partner 1.5 BlueHDi 100CV
 2018– Citroën C-Elysée 1.5 BlueHDi
 2018– Citroën C4 Cactus 1.5 BlueHDi 100
 2018– Citroën Berlingo III 1.5 BlueHDi 100CV
 2018– DS 3 Crossback 1.5 BlueHDi 100
 2018– Opel Combo E 1.5 Diesel 102cv
 8-valve intercooled,  and 
 2018– Peugeot 2008 1.5 BlueHDi 120CV
 2019– Opel Zafira Life / Vivaro C 1.5 Diesel
 2018– Peugeot Traveller / Citroën Spacetourer 1.5 BlueHDi 120CV
 2018– Citroën C4 Cactus 1.5 BlueHDi 120
 2018– Toyota ProAce 1.5 BlueHDi 120CV
 16-valve intercooled,  and 
 2017– Peugeot 308 II 1.5 BlueHDi
 2018– Peugeot 508 II 1.5 BlueHDi
 2018– Peugeot Rifter/Partner 1.5 BlueHDi 130CV
 2018– Citroën Berlingo III 1.5 BlueHDi 130CV
 2018– DS 3 Crossback 1.5 BlueHDi 130
 2018– Opel Combo E 1.5 Diesel 130cv
 2017– Peugeot 3008 II 1.5 BlueHDi
 2017– Peugeot 5008 II 1.5 BlueHDi
 2018– Citroën C4 Spacetourer 1.5 BlueHDi
 2018– Citroën C5 Aircross 1.5 BlueHDi
 2017– DS 7 Crossback 1.5 BlueHDi
 2018– Opel Grandland (formerly Opel Grandland X) 1.5 Turbo D

DLD-416

The DLD-416 (or DV6) is a 1.6 L (1560 cc) UK-built version used by Ford, Volvo, PSA, Mini, Suzuki and Mazda.

The first DV6 has a DOHC 16-valve design, with an intercooled variable-geometry turbocharger (for example, Garrett GT1544V), and with Diesel particulate filter is Euro 5 compliant.
In 2011 the 16-valve DOHC was reduced to 8-valve SOHC and called DV-6C/DV-6D.

DLD-418
The Duratorq DLD-418 is a 1.8 L (1753 cc) intercooled common rail diesel engine. It is only a DLD by name, since it is completely unrelated to the 1.4/1.6 units, and is derived from Ford's own 1.8 8-valve Endura-D engine that saw service through the 1980s and 1990s. However, Ford considers it part of the DLD family, as evidenced by the official "DLD" name.

The Endura-D was heavily revised and updated with a variable-vane turbocharger and a Delphi high-pressure common rail injection system and relaunched in 2001 as the DuraTorq TDCi, with the original engine being rebadged 'DuraTorq TDDi'.

The latest versions of the DLD-418 were released with the 2007 Ford Mondeo.

  and :
 2001–2004 Ford Focus 1.8 TDCi 115PS
  and :
 2002–2004 Ford Focus 1.8 TDCi 100PS
  and :
 2005–2011 Ford Focus 1.8 TDCi 115PS
 2005–2010 Ford Focus C-MAX 1.8 TDCi 115PS
  and :
 2006–2012 Ford Galaxy 1.8 TDCi 100PS
 2007–2012 Ford Mondeo 1.8 TDCi 100PS
  and :
 2006–2012 Ford Galaxy 1.8 TDCi 125PS
 2006–2012 Ford S-Max 1.8 TDCi 125PS
 2007–2012 Ford Mondeo 1.8 TDCi 125PS

See also:

See also
 Ford Duratorq engine
 List of Ford engines
 PSA HDi engine
 List of PSA engines

References

Ford engines
PSA engines
Diesel engines by maker
Ford DLD
Straight-four engines